The men's large hill team ski jumping competition for the 2010 Winter Olympics in Vancouver, Canada was held at Whistler Olympic Park in Whistler, British Columbia on 22 February. The Austrian team of Andreas Widhölzl, Martin Koch, Andreas Kofler, and Thomas Morgenstern were the defending Olympic champions in this event. Widhölzl retired after the 2007-08 season. Austria was also the defending world champions in this event with the team of Wolfgang Loitzl, Koch, Morgenstern, and Gregor Schlierenzauer. The last World Cup event in this format prior to the 2010 Games took place at Willingen, Germany on 7 February 2010 and was won by the German team of Michael Neumayer, Pascal Bodmer, Martin Schmitt, and Michael Uhrmann.

Results 
Austria defended their Olympic title with Schlierenzauer and Loitzl replacing Widhölzl and Koch, respectively. Germany won the silver with Wank replacing Bodmer. Schlierenzauer's 146.5 meter jump was the longest in Olympic history, breaking the record which Switzerland's Simon Ammann had set in the large hill event two days earlier. The Swiss did not participate in that event as they had only sent two ski jumpers to the Olympics.

References 

Ski jumping at the 2010 Winter Olympics